Arthur William Byron (April 3, 1872 – July 16, 1943) was an American actor who played a mixture of British and American roles in films.

Early years 
Byron was the son of actors Kate Crehan and Oliver Doud Byron. He was a nephew of the stage actress Ada Rehan, his maternal aunt.

Career
Byron started his theatrical career in February 1889 at the age of 17 with his father's dramatic company.  In 1939 he celebrated his 50 years in showbusiness.

He appeared in more than 300 plays and played with stars like Maxine Elliott, Ethel Barrymore, John Gielgud, Katherine Cornell, Maude Adams and Minnie Maddern Fiske.

He was the founder and one-time president of The Actors' Equity Association and he also served as an officer of The Lambs and the Actor's fund of America.

Byron appeared many times at the Lakewood Playhouse in Maine.

Personal life and death 
Byron was married to Kathryn Keyes, and they had two daughters and a son. He died of a heart ailment, from which he suffered for some years, in Hollywood in 1943.  He was cremated and his ashes were sent to the Byron summer home in Maine.

Selected filmography

 Nervy Nat Kisses the Bride (1904, Edison)
 Fast Life (1932) - John D. Jameson
 The Mummy (1932) - Sir Joseph Whemple
 20,000 Years in Sing Sing (1932) - Warden Paul Long
 Gabriel Over the White House (1933) - Jasper Brooks - Secretary of State
 The Silk Express (1933) - Conductor Clark
 Private Detective 62 (1933) - Tracey (uncredited)
 The Mayor of Hell (1933) - Judge Gilbert
 College Coach (1933) - Dr. Phillip Sargent
 Two Alone (1934) - Slag
 The House of Rothschild (1934) - Baring
 Stand Up and Cheer! (1934) - John Harly
 Fog Over Frisco (1934) - Everett Bradford
 The Notorious Sophie Lang (1934) - Police Insp. Stone
 The Man with Two Faces (1934) - Dr. Kendall
 That's Gratitude (1934) - Thomas Maxwell
 Marie Galante (1934) - Gen. Gerald Phillips
 The President Vanishes (1934) - President Craig Stanley
 The Secret Bride (1934) - Governor W.H. Vincent
 Shadow of Doubt (1935) - Morgan Bellwood
 The Whole Town's Talking (1935) - Spencer
 The Casino Murder Case (1935) - Richard Kinkaid
 Murder in the Fleet (1935) - Capt. John Winslow
 Oil for the Lamps of China (1935) - No. 1 Boss
 The Prisoner of Shark Island (1936) - Mr. Erickson
 The Prisoner of Zenda (1937) - (scenes deleted) (final film role)

References

External links

Arthur Byron portrait gallery at the University of Washington
Broadway Photographs(Univ. of S. Carolina)

1872 births
1943 deaths
American male film actors
Male actors from New York City
People from Brooklyn
20th-century American male actors
Presidents of the Actors' Equity Association